The predatory tunicate (Megalodicopia hians), also known as the ghostfish, is a species of tunicate which lives anchored along deep-sea canyon walls and the seafloor. It is unique among other tunicates in that rather than being a filter feeder, it has adapted to life as an ambush predator. Its mouth-like siphon is quick to close whenever a small animal such as a crustacean or a fish drifts inside. Once the predatory tunicate catches a meal, it keeps its trap shut until the animal inside is digested.

Predatory tunicates are hermaphrodites, producing both eggs and sperm which drift into the water. If there are no other tunicates nearby, they can self-fertilize the eggs.

Taxonomy
The predatory tunicate belongs to the family Octacnemidae, which is a group of deep-sea ascidians. Thanks to the hypertrophied oral siphon, two larger lips have formed to be able to catch prey.

Octacnemidae have been suspected to share phylogenetic relations with the families Cionidae and/or Corellidae due to the similarities in their morphology.

Distribution
Megalodicopia hians can be found sparsely to depths of about  through the Monterey Canyon system. Their abundance tended to be the greatest in the oxygen-minimum zone, which is  down.

References

External links
Predatory tunicates
Monterey Bay Aquarium

Tunicates
Animals described in 1918